Roadmaster is the third studio album by Gene Clark, released in January 1973. The album was compiled from various unreleased recordings for A&M Records made in 1970 through 1972. Eight tracks are from an April 1972 recording session featuring Clarence White, Chris Ethridge, Spooner Oldham, Sneaky Pete Kleinow, Byron Berline and Michael Clarke; two tracks ("One in a Hundred" and "She's the Kind of Girl") derived from an unissued single reassembling the five original Byrds prior to their 1973 reunion album; and the remaining track, "Here Tonight", had been recorded with The Flying Burrito Brothers. Initially released in the Netherlands and Germany only on the A&M subsidiary Ariola, it was reissued on compact disc for the American market in 1994.

Track listing

Personnel
Tracks 1, 2:  with The Byrds
 Gene Clark – vocals, acoustic guitar
 Chris Hillman – bass guitar, vocals
 David Crosby, Roger McGuinn – guitars, vocals
 Michael Clarke – drums
 Bud Shank – flute on "She's The Kind Of Girl"

Track 3:  with The Flying Burrito Brothers
 Gene Clark – vocals, acoustic guitar
 Chris Hillman – bass guitar, vocals
 Sneaky Pete Kleinow – pedal steel guitar
 Bernie Leadon, Rick Roberts – guitars, vocals
 Michael Clarke – drums

Tracks 4-11:
 Gene Clark – vocals, acoustic guitar, piano
 Clarence White – electric guitar, backing vocals
 Sneaky Pete Kleinow – pedal steel guitar
 Spooner Oldham – keyboards, backing vocals
 Chris Ethridge – bass guitar
 Michael Clarke – drums
 Byron Berline – fiddle
 Roger McGuinn, Rick Clark - backing vocals presumably not included in the definitive album mix

Production
Producers: Jim Dickson (Tracks 1–3), Chris Hinshaw (Tracks 4–11)
Recording Engineer: Chris Hinshaw
Art Direction: n/a
Photography: Henry Diltz
Liner notes: Barry Ballard

References

Gene Clark albums
1973 albums
A&M Records albums